Hexapleomera is a genus of crustaceans belonging to the family Tanaididae. There are 8 species in the genus.

Species
 Hexapleomera bultidactyla Esquete & Fernandez‑Gonzalez, 2016
 Hexapleomera edgari Bamber, 2012
 Hexapleomera moverleyi (Edgar, 2008)
 Hexapleomera robusta (Moore, 1894)
 Hexapleomera satella Bamber, 2012
 Hexapleomera ulsana Wi, Jeong & Kang, 2018
 Hexapleomera urashima Tanabe, Hayashi, Tomioka & Kakui, 2017
 Hexapleomera wombat Bamber, 2012
 Hexapleomera crassa Riggio, 1975 (nomen nudum)

References

 
Malacostraca